Lady Bay may refer to:
Lady Bay, Nottinghamshire
Lady Bay, South Australia, a former shack site near Normanville, South Australia
 Lady Bay, South Australia, a small bay within Port Elliot, South Australia
Lady Bay, a bay and beach in Watsons Bay, New South Wales
Lady Bay, a bay and beach in Warrnambool, Victoria